The Atrium Health Navicent Medical Center is a 637-bed hospital located in Macon, Georgia. Formerly known as The Medical Center of Central Georgia (MCCG), the hospital is part of the Atrium Health Navicent healthcare system. MCNH is the second largest hospital in Georgia, behind Grady Memorial Hospital in Atlanta. MCNH is a teaching hospital affiliated with Mercer University School of Medicine and various schools of nursing. Nationally recognized for high quality care, MCNH serves 30 primary counties throughout central Georgia and southern Georgia, an area of approximately 750,000 residents, in addition to patients throughout the region. MCNH EMS serves Bibb, Jones, Treutlen, and Twiggs Counties. Beverly Knight Olson Children's Hospital, Navicent Health is located adjacent to MCNH.

On February 8, 2018 it was announced that Navicent Health would merge with North Carolina based healthcare system Atrium Health.

History

In March 1895, the Medical Center, then known as the Macon Hospital, was opened. Its administrator was an Atlanta physician named Olin Weaver. In 1915, the city of Macon assumed ownership of the hospital. In 1960, the hospital became a member of the American Hospital Association, though it wasn't until 11 years later, in 1971, that the name was changed to The Medical Center of Central Georgia. On September 3, 2014, Central Georgia Health System, which includes The Medical Center and more than 30 additional entities, announced its new brand identity – Navicent Health. The new Navicent Health brand unified and identified each facility and service line within the health system for the very first time. Navicent Health includes MCNH as well as Rehabilitation Hospital, Navicent Health; Beverly Knight Olson Children's Hospital, Navicent Health; Navicent Health Foundation; Medical Center of Peach County, Navicent Health; Carlyle Place, Navicent Health; Pine Point, Navicent Health; Wellness Center, Navicent Health; and most recently, Navicent Health Baldwin.

On February 8, 2018 it was announced that Navicent Health would merge with North Carolina based healthcare system Atrium Health. They announced on December 20, 2018 that the agreement combining the two organizations had been signed, with Atrium being the controlling party.

MCNH is a nationally recognized academic medical center, nationally verified Level 1 Trauma Center, three-time designated Magnet® hospital for nursing excellence, and serves a service area of 30 primary counties and a population of nearly 750,000 persons. MCNH has over 4,500 employees and a medical staff of approximately 700 physicians. As the second largest hospital in Georgia, it is licensed for 637 beds, including pediatrics, medical-surgical, trauma and cardiac surgery. The Emergency Center, with helipad capability and three urgent care centers, treats over 140,000 visitors per year. MCNH provides a broad range of community-based outpatient diagnostic, primary care, wellness and comprehensive rehabilitation services. It is the primary academic hospital for Mercer University School of Medicine, providing residency and fellowship programs for over 100 residents and is affiliated with multiple universities as a clinical education site.

References 

Hospital buildings completed in 1895
Companies based in Macon, Georgia
Hospitals in Georgia (U.S. state)
Buildings and structures in Macon, Georgia
Atrium Health